Lincoln Park is an urban community in the southeastern section of San Diego, California. It is bordered by Chollas View and the San Diego Trolley on the north, Mountain View and Interstate 805 on the west, Valencia Park and Euclid Avenue on the east, and National City, California on the south. Major thoroughfares include Imperial Avenue, Ocean View Boulevard, and Logan Avenue.

History
The oldest section of Lincoln Park is the residential section between Imperial Avenue and Ocean View Boulevard. California State Route 157 was planned to run through Lincoln Park as an expressway, but that concept has been abandoned.

Demographics
Lincoln Park is a diverse community.  Current demographics for the neighborhood are as follows: people of Hispanic heritage make up 61.0%, followed by African-American at 18.9%, then Asian at 11.8%,  Other race at 4.3%, non-Hispanic Whites at 3.0%, and Mixed Race at 1.0%. It ranked near the bottom at 122 out of 125 San Diego neighborhoods in terms of lowest percentage of non-Hispanic whites, and 3 out of 125 San Diego neighborhoods in terms of total population that is non-White (roughly 97%), only to be surpassed by San Ysidro and Southcrest.

Image
Lincoln Park has gone through decades of criminal trauma, including drug sales, gang violence, and homicide, often related to ongoing gang feuds with other Southeast San Diego neighborhoods, among them, the East Side Pirus of Skyline. The intersection of Euclid Ave and Imperial Ave has long been considered "The Four Corners of Death" due to the staggering number of deaths that have occurred in and around the area, as well as it serving as an unofficial boundary to several gangs territories. Of the county’s estimated 88 gangs, at least 50 operate within a few square miles of this intersection.

According to data reported by the San Diego Police Department, 1,600 crimes were reported in the area from 2013 through 2019, with overall crime increasing by about 33 percent.

In 2010, Lincoln Park along with nearby Southeast San Diego neighborhood, Logan Heights, were featured on The History Channel's Gangland television series. The Lincoln Park Bloods were featured on the Season 7 episode titled, "Vendetta of Blood" which first aired on May 14, 2010.

One of the main centers of gang activity in Lincoln Park revolve around "The Dip", a densely populated stretch of Logan Ave between 47th St and Euclid Ave. Central to the area is the sprawling Bay Vista Housing Projects (now known as Sea Breeze Gardens) which appear extensively in the Gangland episode featuring Lincoln Park. Notable actor and rapper, Nick Cannon grew up in the neighborhood and experienced a great deal of violence in his childhood, noting his refusal to glorify that aspect of his life because he had lost a lot of friends to "senseless gang violence." Prolific Underground Hip Hop artist and fellow Lincoln Park native, Mitchy Slick, noted Nick Cannon's father as an original member of the Lincoln Park Bloods.

Rallies for peace in Lincoln Park have occurred periodically over the years, calling for the end of gang violence for all of Southeast San Diego, with more recent efforts to revitalize the area through the arts geared towards ending the negative stigma of Euclid and Imperial and reclaiming the deadly street intersection as "The Four Corners of Life."

Landmarks and facilities
Chollas Creek runs through Lincoln Park.

Education

Lincoln Park is served by the San Diego Unified School District along with some charter and private schools. Public schools in Lincoln Park include Lincoln High School, and John F. Kennedy and Knox Elementary Schools, as well as St. Rita's Catholic School.

Much like the rest of Southeast San Diego, many students in Lincoln Park have taken advantage of San Diego Unified School District's Voluntary Enrollment Exchange Program (VEEP), and have opted to be bused to high schools in San Diego's more affluent northern suburban neighborhoods,. Depending on their VEEP Allied School Pattern, a high school student may be voluntarily bused to Mira Mesa High School, Mission Bay High School, Scripps Ranch High School, Serra High School, and University City High School.

References

Neighborhoods in San Diego